The 1984–85 World Series was a One Day International (ODI) cricket tri-series where Australia played host to Sri Lanka and the West Indies. Australia and West Indies reached the Finals, which West Indies won 2–1. Sri Lanka and West Indies would not contest the tri-series again until the 1995-96 season

Points Table

Result summary

Final series
West Indies won the best of three final series against Australia 2–1.

References

External links 
 Tournament home at ESPNcricinfo

1984 in cricket
1985 in cricket
1984 in Australian cricket
1985 in Australian cricket
Australian Tri-Series
1984–85
1984–85 Australian cricket season
International cricket competitions from 1980–81 to 1985